Salvatore Rossi OMRI (born 6 January 1949) is an Italian economist.

Senior Deputy Governor of the Bank of Italy and President of the Italian Insurance Supervisory Authority.

Education and career
Salvatore Rossi was born in Bari, Italy. In 1975, he graduated from the University of Bari with a degree in mathematics. He has been a visiting scholar at the International Monetary Fund (IMF) and the Massachusetts Institute of Technology.

In 1976, he joined the Bank of Italy and in 2000 became the head of the Economic Research Department.

From 2007 to 2011, he was the chief economist of the Economic Research and International Relations Area. In 2011 he became secretary general and advisor to the Governing Board of the Bank of Italy for economic policy matters. From 17 January 2012 to May 2013, he was a member of the Governing Board of the Bank of Italy as deputy governor. He has taught courses and seminars at the University of Rome Tor Vergata and at the University of Bari. From 2013 to 2019 He was the senior deputy governor of the Bank of Italy and President of the Italian Insurance Supervisory Authority.

From January 2013 to February 2016, he was a member of the Fondo Strategico Italiano. He is the Senior Fellow at the LUISS School of European Political Economy.

From May 2012 to 2019, he was member of the Foundation Board of the International Centre for Monetary and Banking Studies of Geneva (http://www.icmb.ch/). He is member of the board of governors of Fondazione Giovanni Agnelli and of the board of the Einaudi Institute for Economics and Finance(EIEF).

On 30 March 2013 President of the Republic Giorgio Napolitano named Salvatore Rossi among the ten “wise men”, a select group of people who were entrusted the task to devise a policy platform for a new Italian government.

Works

Salvatore Rossi is the author of various articles, essays and books on topics such as international economy, economic politics and history, industrial economy.
Competere in Europa (ed.), Il Mulino, Bologna, 1993
La bilancia dei pagamenti: i conti con l'estero dell'Italia, la lira, i problemi dell'unione monetaria europea, with R.S. Masera, CEDAM, Padua, 1993
La politica economica italiana 1968-1998, Laterza, Rome-Bari 1998, revised editions 2000, 2003, 2007
La nuova economia: i fatti dietro il mito (ed.), Il Mulino, Bologna, 2003
La regina e il cavallo. Quattro mosse contro il declino, Laterza, Rome–Bari, 2006
Controtempo. L'Italia nella crisi mondiale, Laterza, Rome–Bari, 2009
Processo alla finanza, Laterza, Rome-Bari, 2013
Che cosa sa fare l'Italia, with Anna Giunta, Laterza, Rome-Bari, 2017
Oro, Il Mulino, Bologna, 2018

Awards and honours

References

External links
 Bank of Italy website
 IVASS website

1949 births
Living people
Italian economists
People from Bari
Academic staff of the University of Rome Tor Vergata